Footsteps in the Snow is a 1966 low-budget independent Canadian thriller film directed by Martin Green and co-written by Green with Dan Daniels. The film features, in a minor role, Veronica Lake, in her second-to-last film role, after 15 years away from the screen. The film was not released in the United States, and went largely unnoticed.

References

External links
 
 

1966 films
English-language Canadian films
1960s thriller films
Canadian thriller films
1960s English-language films
1960s Canadian films